Epicenter Studios, based in Sherman Oaks, California, was a video game developer founded by talent from, among other titles, the commercially successful, critically acclaimed Call of Duty franchise. Epicenter Studios recently released its first title Critter Round-Up (Animal Panic in Japan) at the Japanese Nintendo WiiWare launch on March 25, 2008. Critter Round-up was the only game in the group developed by a US team.

Games developed

References

External links

Companies based in Los Angeles
American companies established in 2007
Privately held companies based in California
Video game companies of the United States
Video game development companies